The  singles tournament at the 2006 Family Circle Cup took place between April 10 and April 16, 2006  on the indoor clay courts of the Family Circle Tennis Center in Charleston, United States. Justine Henin-Hardenne was the defending champion, but lost to Patty Schnyder in the semifinals. Nadia Petrova won the title, defeating Patty Schnyder in the final.

Seeds

Draw

Finals

Top half

Section 1

Section 2

Bottom half

Section 3

Section 4

References
 Main draw

Charleston Open
Family Circle Cup - Singles